Encyclopedia of War: Ancient Battles is a 1988 video game published by Cases Computer Simulations.

Gameplay
Ancient Battles is a game in which all of the major armies and weapon types of antiquity are represented.

Reception
Lt. H. E. Dille reviewed the game for Computer Gaming World, and stated that "Ancient Battles is an enjoyable game that will continue to challenge players long after other games have started to gather dust on the shelf. The subject matter is a refreshing change of pace for experienced wargamers, but remains basic enough for budding enthusiasts to master."

Reviews
Crash! - Mar, 1989
Your Sinclair - Mar, 1989
Computer Gaming World - Oct, 1990
ACE (Advanced Computer Entertainment) - May, 1989
Amiga Format - Mar, 1991
Amiga Power - May, 1991

References

External links
Review in Sinclair User 

1988 video games
Amiga games
Amstrad CPC games
Computer wargames
DOS games
Turn-based strategy video games
Video games developed in the United Kingdom
Video games set in the Roman Empire
ZX Spectrum games